November 17 - Eastern Orthodox liturgical calendar - November 19

All fixed commemorations below are observed on December 1 by Orthodox Churches on the Old Calendar.

For November 18, Orthodox Churches on the Old Calendar commemorate the Saints listed on November 5.

Saints

 Martyr Romanus the Deacon of Caesarea, and child-martyr Barulas of Antioch (298 or 303)
 Great-martyr Platon of Ancyra (306)
 Martyrs Zacchaeus the Deacon and Alphaeus, of Caesarea in Palestine (307)
 Venerable Basil.

Pre-Schism Western saints

 Saint Maximus of Mainz, nineteenth Bishop of Mainz in Germany from 354 to 378, who suffered greatly at the hands of the Arians (378)
 Martyrs Oriculus and Companions, martyrs under the Arian Vandals near Carthage in North Africa (c. 430)
 Saint Nazarius, a monk and Abbot of Lérins in France (c. 450)
 Saint Mabyn (Mabena), nun of Cornwall (5th century)
 Saint Mawes (Maudetus, Maudez), Bishop in Cornwall and Brittany (5th or 6th century)
 Saint Keverne (Akeveranus), a friend of St Kieran or Piran in Cornwall (6th century)
 Saint Mummolus (Mumbolus, Momleolus, Momble), born in Ireland, he was a companion of St Fursey whom he succeeded as Abbot of Lagny in France (c. 690)
 Saints Amandus (708) and Anselm (c. 750), Abbots of Lérins Abbey.
 Saint Constant, priest-hermit at Lough Erne in Ireland (777)
 Saint Odo of Cluny (942)

Post-Schism Orthodox saints

 Saint Helen, Abbess of Novodevichy Convent, Moscow (1547)
 New Martyr Anastasius of Paramythia in Epirus, by beheading, and martyr Daniel (Musa) (1743 or 1750)
 Saint Nicholas, priest, confessor (1948)

Other commemorations

 Translation of the relics of venerable martyr Cosmas of Vatopedi (1276)
 Synaxis of All Saints of Estonia. 
 Repose of Schema-Archimandrite Vitaly (Sidorenko) of Glinsk and Tbilisi (1992)

Icon gallery

Notes

References

Sources
 November 18 / December 1. Orthodox Calendar (PRAVOSLAVIE.RU).
 December 1 / November 18. Holy Trinity Russian Orthodox Church (A parish of the Patriarchate of Moscow).
 November 18. OCA - The Lives of the Saints.
 The Autonomous Orthodox Metropolia of Western Europe and the Americas (ROCOR). St. Hilarion Calendar of Saints for the year of our Lord 2004. St. Hilarion Press (Austin, TX). p. 86.
 The Eighteenth Day of the Month of November. Orthodoxy in China.
 November 18. Latin Saints of the Orthodox Patriarchate of Rome.
 The Roman Martyrology. Transl. by the Archbishop of Baltimore. Last Edition, According to the Copy Printed at Rome in 1914. Revised Edition, with the Imprimatur of His Eminence Cardinal Gibbons. Baltimore: John Murphy Company, 1916. p. 355-356.
 Rev. Richard Stanton. A Menology of England and Wales, or, Brief Memorials of the Ancient British and English Saints Arranged According to the Calendar, Together with the Martyrs of the 16th and 17th Centuries. London: Burns & Oates, 1892. pp. 554-557.
Greek Sources
 Great Synaxaristes:  18 ΝΟΕΜΒΡΙΟΥ. ΜΕΓΑΣ ΣΥΝΑΞΑΡΙΣΤΗΣ.
  Συναξαριστής. 18 Νοεμβρίου. ECCLESIA.GR. (H ΕΚΚΛΗΣΙΑ ΤΗΣ ΕΛΛΑΔΟΣ). 
  18/11/2015. Ορθόδοξος Συναξαριστής. 
Russian Sources
  1 декабря (18 ноября). Православная Энциклопедия под редакцией Патриарха Московского и всея Руси Кирилла (электронная версия). (Orthodox Encyclopedia - Pravenc.ru).
  18 ноября по старому стилю / 1 декабря по новому стилю. Русская Православная Церковь - Православный церковный календарь на 2018 год.

November in the Eastern Orthodox calendar